Ballycarry railway station serves Ballycarry and Islandmagee in County Antrim, Northern Ireland, the station was opened on 1 October 1862.

Today there is just a  single platform, there is a stationmaster's old cottage on a disused platform, this is now privately owned.

Service
On Sundays there is a service every two hours in either direction to Larne Harbour or Great Victoria Street.

References

External links

Railway stations in County Antrim
Railway stations served by NI Railways
Railway stations opened in 1862
1862 establishments in Ireland
Railway stations in Northern Ireland opened in the 19th century